The Annunciation is a 1495 oil on panel painting by Cima da Conegliano, now in the Hermitage Museum, in Saint Petersburg, Russia.

References

Paintings by Cima da Conegliano
Paintings in the collection of the Hermitage Museum
1495 paintings
Cima de Conegliano